Boshra Al-Shaeby (born 1995) is a Jordanian chess player who holds the title of Woman FIDE master (WFM, 2012), 43rd Chess Olympiad (women) individual gold medalist (2018).

Chess career
In 2011, Boshra Al-Shaeby won Arab Youth Chess Championship in girls U16 age group. She twice won Jordan Women's Chess Championship (2015, 2018). Two years in row Boshra Al-Shaeby won bronze medal in Arab Women's Individual Chess Championship: in 2016 (5 pts. out of 7 games) and in 2017 (7 pts. out of 9 games). Also two years in row she won Arab Women's Individual Blitz Championship (2016, 2017).

Boshra Al-Shaeby played for Jordan in the Women's Chess Olympiads:
 In 2010, at fourth board in the 39th Chess Olympiad (women) in Khanty-Mansiysk (+6, =0, -3),
 In 2012, at fourth board in the 40th Chess Olympiad (women) in Istanbul (+4, =3, -4),
 In 2014, at fourth board in the 41st Chess Olympiad (women) in Tromsø (+3, =3, -4),
 In 2016, at third board in the 42nd Chess Olympiad (women) in Baku (+6, =0, -5),
 In 2018, at reserve board in the 43rd Chess Olympiad (women) in Batumi (+8, =0, -0) and won individual gold medal.
Boshra Al-Shaeby played for Jordan in the Men's Asian Team Chess Championship (2016).
Boshra Al-Shaeby played for Jordan in the Pan Arab Games (women) Team Chess Championship (2011) and won team silver medal.

References

External links

Boshra Al-Shaeby chess games at 365Chess.com

1995 births
Jordanian chess players
Chess Woman FIDE Masters
Living people
Chess Olympiad competitors
Chess players at the 2010 Asian Games